FIFA, through several companies, sold the rights for the broadcast of 2006 FIFA World Cup to the following broadcasters.

Television
Broadcasters that were confirmed to be screening some or all of the matches in standard definition are in bold. Broadcasters screening matches in UHF were free-to-air.

References

External links

Broadcasting rights
2006